Louk Dekkers (born 3 March 1998) is a Dutch football player who plays for AVV Swift in the Dutch Hoofdklasse.

Club career
He made his Eerste Divisie debut for Jong FC Utrecht on 22 September 2017 in a game against RKC Waalwijk.

References

External links
 

1998 births
Living people
Dutch footballers
Jong FC Utrecht players
Eerste Divisie players
Tweede Divisie players
Association football midfielders
Sportspeople from Hilversum
Koninklijke HFC players
AVV Swift players
Footballers from North Holland